Sage International School is a public K-12 charter school program which is a member of the International Baccalaureate Organization.

History
Sage was started in 2010 by Don Keller, Bill Carter, Kim Carter-Cram, Mike Cram, and Nancy Glenn, and started with 214 students in the old Sara Lee Foods offices. The school expanded in 2013, to Downtown Boise in the old mutual creamery building, to eventually expanding to the Parkcenter Mall in 2014.  The first graduating class was in 2015-16.  The high school is in the Parkcenter Mall, where grades 2-12 are. Kindergarten and first grade are at the old Sara Lee Foods offices.  Unusual among area schools, Sage is on a Monday through Thursday student schedule, with the teachers doing in-service work on Fridays.

References

International Baccalaureate schools in Idaho
Educational institutions established in 2010
2010 establishments in Idaho